Felipe Roque may refer to:
 Felipe Roque (actor)
 Felipe Roque (volleyball)